Beloslav Municipality is a municipality (obshtina) in Varna Province, Northeastern Bulgaria, not far from the Bulgarian Black Sea Coast. It is named after its administrative centre - the town of Beloslav.

Settlements 

Beloslav Municipality includes the following 4 places (towns are shown in bold):

Demography 
The following table shows the change of the population during the last four decades.

Religion 
According to the latest Bulgarian census of 2011, the religious composition, among those who answered the optional question on religious identification, was the following:

An overwhelming majority of the population of Beloslav Municipality identify themselves as Christians. At the 2011 census, 82.5% of respondents identified as Orthodox Christians belonging to the Bulgarian Orthodox Church.

See also
Provinces of Bulgaria
Municipalities of Bulgaria
List of cities and towns in Bulgaria

References

External links
 Beloslav Municipality info-website 

Municipalities in Varna Province